The Harry E. Fife House, also known as Beck Home, is an historic house in Canton, Ohio, that was designed by architect Guy Tilden and was built in 1896.  The design reflects Tilden's enduring love of towers....[and was] [b]uilt for Harry
Fife, an early independent insurance man and stock broker.

It was listed on the National Register of Historic Places in 1987.

References

Houses on the National Register of Historic Places in Ohio
Shingle Style architecture in Ohio
Houses completed in 1896
Houses in Stark County, Ohio
National Register of Historic Places in Stark County, Ohio
Buildings and structures in Canton, Ohio